
This is a complete List of National Historic Landmarks in Idaho. The United States National Historic Landmark program is operated under the auspices of the National Park Service, and recognizes structures, districts, objects, and similar resources nationwide according to a list of criteria of national dept.

The state of Idaho is home to 10 of these landmarks, spanning a range of history from the Lewis and Clark expedition to the beginnings of nuclear power.
The table below lists all 10 of these sites, along with added detail and description.

|}

There are other historic sites preserved in Idaho.  Considering them provides perspective on the NHLs.  In particular, there are two areas in the National Park System:
Nez Perce National Historical Park, a set of 38 sites located throughout the states of Idaho, Montana, Oregon, and Washington which are the traditional aboriginal lands of the Nez Perce. The sites commemorate the history, culture, and stories of the people. Its headquarters are located in Lapwai, Idaho.
Minidoka National Historic Site, established in 2001, one of ten camps at which Japanese Americans were interned during 1942-45.

Besides the NHLs and NPS areas, the state has approximately 1,000 properties and districts listed in Idaho on the National Register of Historic Places.  Some recently listed properties may not yet be in that system.  New listings nationwide are announced weekly.

See also

 National Parks in Idaho
Historic preservation
History of Idaho
National Register of Historic Places listings in Idaho
Nez Perce National Historical Park
Minidoka National Historic Site

References

External links
National Historic Landmark Program at the National Park Service
Lists of National Historic Landmarks

Idaho
 
National Historic Landmarks
National Historic Landmarks